The Moapa Southern Paiute Solar Project is a 250 megawatt (MWAC) photovoltaic power plant located in Clark County, Nevada on the Moapa River lands of the Southern Paiute people.  The project was commissioned in March 2017 and was constructed by First Solar and its sub-contractors in close consultation with the Moapa Band of Paiutes and federal agencies.  It is the first utility-scale solar project to be located on North American tribal lands, and is anticipated to evolve as a model for similar future economic and environmental partnerships.

Project details

The project is located 30 miles north of Las Vegas, Nevada on the 72,000 acre (112 sq mile) Moapa River Indian Reservation.  It is  the culmination of seven years of planning, including a final 2.5 years of construction work. The project entailed clearing a total of approximately 2,000 acres (2.2 sq miles) in dispersed sections that minimize the desert habitat and tribal cultural impacts. 115 Native Americans were employed throughout the development, including about 50 local tribal members, along with another 485 local subcontractors during the construction phase.

The project was originally developed by K Road Power Holdings, which was acquired by First Solar in 2013. TerraSmart provided foundation and racking services,  and First Solar provided nearly 3.2 million CdTe thin film solar panels.  The new facility also includes an onsite substation, and a new 5.5 mile 500 kV transmission line that connects to Nevada Power Company's Crystal Substation, serving energy users in California.  First Solar Energy Services is providing ongoing operations and maintenance support, sustaining five permanent jobs which currently include two tribal members who are certified electricians.

The plant is currently owned by Capital Dynamics. The power is being sold to the Los Angeles Department of Water and Power (LADWP) under a 25-year power purchase agreement.

Environment considerations

Based on the Environmental Impact Statement and Biological Opinion rendered in connection with United States Fish and Wildlife Service, First Solar has provided the Tribe, together with the U.S. Bureau of Land Management, with more than $1.6 million in mitigation fees for protection of the threatened desert tortoise.

Commissioning of the plant was shortly preceded by closure of the 558 MW coal-fired Reid Gardner Generating Station  bordering the reservation.  The project also accelerated LADWP's California-mandated withdrawal from support of the coal-fired Navajo Generating Station.

Tribal benefits and opportunities

The project is providing long-term revenue for the Tribe through land lease payments, consulting fees, and an increase in sales of goods & services.  It has also increased education on energy assistance programs aimed at stabilizing tribal member's electricity costs.   The Maopa Band of Paiutes is currently pursuing additional renewable energy opportunities, including development of the 300 MW Eagle Shadow Mountain Solar Farm.

Electricity production

Moapa Travel Plaza microgrid

A ceremony to inaugurate completion of a solar-hybrid microgrid system for the Tribe's travel business center and largest employer at the Valley of Fire exit off Interstate 15 north of Las Vegas was separately held on April 8, 2014, by the Tribal Council, and joined by officials from the U.S. Department of Agriculture (USDA) and system developer Stronghold Engineering.   This system includes nine 28 kW Soitec CPV CX-S530 trackers, battery storage, and three diesel generators meeting Tier 4 EPA emission standards. The $2.38 million USDA-funded project is expected to save approximately $700,000 and 3.6 million CO2 pounds in annual fuel costs.

See also 

 Solar power in Nevada
 List of power stations in Nevada

References

External links 
 VIDEO:Moapi Southern Paiute Solar Commissioning Ceremony
  Tribal Renewable Energy Workshop Presentation

Solar power in the Mojave Desert
Photovoltaic power stations in the United States
Solar power stations in Nevada
Buildings and structures in Clark County, Nevada